Václav Vačkář (born August 12, 1881, Died on February 4, 1954) was a Czech composer and conductor of the late romantic era. He was the father of Dalibor Cyril Vačkář, who was also a notable Czech composer. He is well known for his marches especially for his March “Šohaj” which is well known in his native Czechia. Vačkář is also a very prolific composer with over 300 original pieces of music.

Vačkář received military training in Przemyśl, Poland, from 1895-1898 during which he began learning about music through a military program. After his time in Poland Váckář began to play and conduct in various local orchestras including the Czech Philharmonic. In 1952 he wrote the book “Instrumentace Symfonického Orchestru a Hudby Dechové” (Instrumentation for the Symphony Orchestra and Wind Music) with his aforementioned son Dalibor Cyril Vačkář which is still taught in Czech conservatories.

Influences 
Vaćkář‘s predecessor Bedřich Smetana innovated the Czech nationalistic style. A style that embodied the desire many Czechs felt to secede from the Austrian Empire and was also adopted by many Czech composers — including Vaćkář. Another significant influence on Vačkář was Antonín Dvořák who was also a champion of Czech nationalism. Dvořak composed a series of Bohemian dances called the “Slavonic Dances” which impart inspired Vačkář to compose his own dances from Bohemia.

References 

Czech composers
Czech male composers
Czech conductors (music)
Male conductors (music)
Musicians from Prague
1881 births
1954 deaths
20th-century Czech male musicians